The 2000 Mercedes-Benz Cup was a men's tennis tournament played on outdoor hard courts at the Los Angeles Tennis Center in Los Angeles, California in the United States and was part of the International Series of the 2000 ATP Tour. The tournament ran from July 24 through July 30, 2000. Fourth-seeded Michael Chang won the singles title.

Finals

Singles

 Michael Chang defeated  Jan-Michael Gambill 6–7(2–7), 6–3 retired
 It was Chang's 1st title of the year and the 34th, and last, of his career.

Doubles

 Paul Kilderry /  Sandon Stolle defeated  Jan-Michael Gambill /  Scott Humphries walkover

References

External links
 ITF tournament edition details

Mercedes-Benz Cup
Los Angeles Open (tennis)
Mercedes-Benz Cup
Mercedes-Benz Cup
Mercedes-Benz Cup